Viscount Head, of Throope in the County of Wiltshire, is a title in the Peerage of the United Kingdom. It was created in 1960 for the soldier and Conservative politician Antony Head. He had previously served as Secretary of State for War and as Minister of Defence.  the title is held by his eldest son, the second Viscount, who succeeded in 1983.

The family seat is Throope Manor, near Salisbury, Wiltshire.

Viscounts Head (1960)
Antony Henry Head, 1st Viscount Head (1906–1983)
Richard Antony Head, 2nd Viscount Head (b. 1937)

The heir apparent is the present holder's son the Hon. Henry Julian Head (b. 1980)

Line of Succession

  Antony Henry Head, 1st Viscount Head (1906–1983)
  Richard Antony Head, 2nd Viscount Head (born 1937)
 (1) Hon. Henry Julian Head (b. 1980)
 (2) Hon. George Richard Head (b. 1982)
 (3) Leo Patrick Harold Head (b. 2013)
 (4) Hon. Simon Andrew Head (b. 1944)

Arms

Notes

References
Kidd, Charles, Williamson, David (editors). Debrett's Peerage and Baronetage (1990 edition). New York: St Martin's Press, 1990,

External links

Viscountcies in the Peerage of the United Kingdom
Noble titles created in 1960
Noble titles created for UK MPs